Avicularia merianae is a species of spiders in the family Theraphosidae, found in Peru. It was first described in 2017. It is named after the Dutch-German naturalist and painter Maria Sibylla Merian, in recognition of her studies on tarantulas.

References

Theraphosidae
Spiders of South America
Endemic fauna of Peru
Spiders described in 2017